Steven Bradley (born 17 March 2002) is a Scottish professional footballer who plays as a winger for Scottish Premiership club Livingston.

Career

Bradley was in the Rangers youth system, playing alongside Nathan Patterson, but was released after six years. After a period in boys' club football he signed with Queen's Park. He started his senior career there and made five appearances in League Two during the 2018–19 season.

Bradley signed a three-year contract with Hibernian in July 2019, and he made his professional debut on 12 December 2020 in a Scottish Premiership game against Hamilton Academical. He had previously played for the Hibs first team in League Cup matches against Forfar Athletic and Dundee.

On 6 September 2021, Bradley signed a new three-year deal with Hibernian, then joined Ayr United on a season-long loan. 
On 3 January 2022, Bradley was recalled by his parent club Hibernian. He subsequently joined League of Ireland Premier Division side Dundalk on a season long loan deal. Bradley scored four goals in his first three appearances for the club, helping him win the Player of the Month award for February.

On 14 December 2022, Scottish Premiership club Livingston announced that Bradley had signed a 2-and-a-half year deal, though he could not play until 1 January 2023.

Career statistics

Honours

Individual
League of Ireland Player of the Month: February 2022

References

2002 births
Living people
Association football wingers
Scottish footballers
Scottish Professional Football League players
Queen's Park F.C. players
Hibernian F.C. players
Place of birth missing (living people)
Ayr United F.C. players
Dundalk F.C. players
League of Ireland players
Expatriate association footballers in the Republic of Ireland

Livingston F.C. players
Scottish expatriate footballers
Expatriate association footballers in Ireland
Footballers from Glasgow